John or Jack Bailey may refer to:

People

Politicians
John Bailey (MP) (died 1436), English politician 
John Bailey (Australian politician) (born 1954), Australian politician
John Bailey (Massachusetts politician) (1786–1835), American politician
Jack Bailey (New South Wales politician) (1871–1947), Australian politician
John Edgar Bailey (1897–1958), Northern Irish politician
John H. Bailey (1864–1940), American politician, senator and representative in Texas
John Moran Bailey (1904–1975), United States politician, chair of the Democratic National Committee
John Mosher Bailey (1838–1916), U.S. Representative from New York
John Bailey (Irish politician) (1945–2019), member of Dun Laoghaire/Rathdown County Council
Jack Bailey (co-operator) (1898–1969), Welsh co-operative activist, councillor and General Secretary of the Co-operative Party
John Bailey (Victorian politician) (1826–1871), Australian politician
John D. Bailey (1928–2018), American mayor of St. Augustine, Florida

Sports
Jack Bailey (footballer, born 1901) (1901–?), English football player
Jack Bailey (footballer, born 1921) (1921–1986), English football player
John Bailey (footballer, born 1950), English football player and chairman
John Bailey (footballer, born 1957), English football player
John Bailey (footballer, born 1969), English football player
J. A. Bailey (Jack Arthur Bailey, 1930–2018), English cricketer and administrator
John Bailey (rugby league) (born 1954), Australian rugby league footballer and coach
John Bailey (English cricketer) (born 1940), English cricketer
John Bailey (New Zealand cricketer) (born 1941), New Zealand cricketer

Law
John O. Bailey (1880–1959), State supreme court justice from Oregon
John P. Bailey (born 1951), United States federal judge
Sir John Bailey (solicitor) (1928–2021), British lawyer and public servant

Actors
Jack Bailey (actor) (1907–1980), American actor and daytime game show host
John Bailey (British actor) (1912–1989), British screen and TV actor
John Bailey (American actor) (1947–1994), a.k.a. Jack Baker

Music
John Bailey (luthier) (1931–2011), maker of fine guitars in England
John Bailey (producer), Canadian recording engineer, producer

Others
John Bailey (minister) (1643–1697), English dissenting minister, later in life in New England
John Bailey (agriculturist) (1750–1819), English agriculturist and engraver
John Bailey (cinematographer) (born 1942), American cinematographer and film director
John Bailey (critic) (1864–1931), English literary critic, lecturer, and chairman of the National Trust
John Bailey Denton (1814–1893), British surveyor and civil engineer
J. Michael Bailey (born 1957), American psychologist and professor at Northwestern University
John William Bailey (1831–1914), British miniature painter
John Bailey (cutler) (1736–?), American cutler and metalworker
John Eglington Bailey (1840–1888), English antiquary
John Frederick Bailey (1866–1938), botanist and horticulturist in Queensland, Australia

Other uses
 J.V. Bailey House (John Vincent Bailey House), Saint Paul, Minnesota, USA

See also

 
Jonathan Bailey (disambiguation)
John Baillie (disambiguation)
John Bayley (disambiguation)
John Baily (disambiguation)